The General Electric is the fourth studio album by New Zealand band Shihad, released in October 1999. It peaked at No. 1 on the New Zealand albums chart and was certified triple platinum (under New Zealand). and on the Australian ARIA Albums Chart it peaked at No. 23. It was their first album to gain platinum certification in New Zealand (has since gone 3x platinum) and is Shihad's best selling album to date.

Previously released songs – "Wait And See", "Just Like Everybody Else" and "Spacing" – were re-recorded for the album.

The General Electric was produced by Garth Richardson, who had previously produced bands such as Rage Against the Machine, Chevelle and Red Hot Chili Peppers.

Track listing

Bonus disc

 "The General Electric" Live at the Gold Coast BDO
 "Thin White Line" Live at Adelaide BDO
 "You Again" Live at Sydney BDO
 "My Mind's Sedate" Live at Melbourne BDO
 "Pacifier" Live at the Gold Coast BDO
 "Home Again" Live at the Auckland BDO
 "The General Electric" Music Video
 "My Mind's Sedate" Music Video
 "Pacifier" Music Video
 "Wait and See" Music Video 
This bonus disc was also released by itself as either The Channel V Tapes in Australia or The Channel Z Tapes in New Zealand

Credits

 All music and lyrics by Shihad
 Produced by GGGarth
 Mixed by Randy Staub
 Mastered by Howie Weinberg
 Recorded by GGGarth, Sleepy J and Scott Ternan at the Factory Studios, Vancouver, BC, Canada in July 1999
 Mixed at The Factory Studios, Vancouver, BC, Canada
 Mastered at Masterdisc, New York, NY, USA
 Additional background vocals by Jamie Koch

Certifications

References 

Shihad albums
1999 albums
Albums produced by Garth Richardson